George W. Till (born November 7, 1952) is an American Democratic politician. He is a member of the Vermont House of Representatives from the Chittenden 3rd District, having first been elected in 2008.

References

1952 births
Living people
Politicians from Pittsburgh
Democratic Party members of the Vermont House of Representatives
21st-century American politicians